Shaun (or Sean) Wallace (or Wallis) may refer to:

 Sean Wallace (born 1976), American editor and publisher 
 Shaun Wallace (born 1960), English barrister and TV quiz show personality
 Shaun Wallace (cyclist) (born 1961), British cyclist
 Shaun Wallis, English ice hockey player

See also
 Wallace Shawn